Alves Nilo Marcos Lima Fortes (born 6 November 1966), commonly known as Vinha, is a Cape Verdean retired footballer who played as a centre forward.

Football career
Born in Praia, Vinha arrived in Portugal and nearly 22, starting with lowly Atlético Clube de Portugal. After two seasons he moved to the Primeira Liga with S.C. Salgueiros, being an important attacking unit in the Porto side's domestic consolidation.

Vinha's solid performances attracted attention from local FC Porto, and soon after a callup – which did not materialize – to the Portugal national team. During his sole season he featured little, but still managed to contribute with four league goals as the club finished second to S.L. Benfica and won the Taça de Portugal; previously, in the Portuguese Supercup that opened the new campaign, he netted against the same rival in an eventual aggregate triumph (he also scored against Benfica in the league opener, with a trademark header).

In the 1994 summer, Vinha returned to Salgueiros for a further four seasons, always in the top division. After failing to score in his last year, from 20 games, he moved to the lower leagues after a brief spell in the second level with F.C. Paços de Ferreira, retiring in 2001 at F.C. Tirsense.

Vinha faded into obscurity upon retiring, also working as a stand employee at Exponor, a cultural exposition and forum center in Leça da Palmeira.

References

External links

1966 births
Living people
Sportspeople from Praia
Cape Verdean footballers
Association football forwards
Primeira Liga players
Liga Portugal 2 players
Segunda Divisão players
Atlético Clube de Portugal players
S.C. Salgueiros players
FC Porto players
F.C. Paços de Ferreira players
A.D. Lousada players
Imortal D.C. players
F.C. Tirsense players
Cape Verdean expatriate footballers
Expatriate footballers in Portugal
Cape Verdean expatriate sportspeople in Portugal